Ananiv is a city of Podilsk Raion in Odesa Oblast, Ukraine. It hosts the administration of Ananiv urban hromada, one of the hromadas of Ukraine. Ananiv stands on the Tyligul River. Population: 

The town belonged to Moldavian Autonomous Soviet Socialist Republic from 1924 to 1940.

Jewish history 

Jews settled in Ananiv since the 19th century. In 1820, the Jewish community in town owned a synagogue and a  cemetery, which no longer exists, though the new cemetery from the 20th century can be visited. The Surnames on the gravestones are still visible and documented online. Photos of the town Jews from the  beginning of the 20th century are also visible online. In April 1887, a mob attacked and destroyed 175 Jewish homes and 14 shops.

In 1897, 50% of the town population was Jewish.  During 1919, two pogroms in town resulted in more than 40 dead Jews. Under Romanian occupation, more than 330 of the town Jews were killed by Einsatzgruppen 10b. In October 1941, 300 out of the 445 left town. Jews were murdered in nearby Mostove, and the rest a month later in Gvozdiovka. One of these two mass graves is signed in Ukrainian and open to public. In 1990, 30 Jews lived in Ananiv.

Notable people
 Petro Nishchynskyi - Ukrainian composer
 Alexei Barbăneagră
 Mykola Vilinsky
 Bishop Hermogen

References 

Cities in Odesa Oblast
Cities of district significance in Ukraine
Ananyevsky Uyezd
Holocaust locations in Ukraine
Cities in Podilsk Raion